Cowbirds are birds belonging to the genus Molothrus in the family Icteridae. They are of New World origin, and are obligate brood parasites, laying their eggs in the nests of other species.

The genus was introduced by English naturalist William John Swainson in 1832 with the brown-headed cowbird (Molothrus ater) as the type species.

Species
The genus contains six species:

One extinct species, the Talara cowbird (Molothrus resinosus), is known from fossil remains recovered from the Talara Tar Seeps of northwestern Peru, and likely went extinct during the late Quaternary. It may have been a close associate of Pleistocene megafauna communities, and may have gone extinct following their collapse in populations.

The nonparasitic baywings were formerly placed in this genus; they are now classified as Agelaioides.

Behavior 
Cowbirds are insectivores.

The birds in this genus are infamous for laying their eggs in other birds' nests. The female cowbird notes when a potential host bird lays its eggs, and when the nest is left momentarily unattended, the cowbird lays its own egg in it. The female cowbird may continue to observe this nest after laying eggs. Some bird species have evolved the ability to detect such parasitic eggs, and may reject them by pushing them out of their nests, but the female cowbird has been observed to attack and destroy the remaining eggs of such birds as a consequence, dissuading further removals.  Widespread predatory behaviors in cowbirds could slow the evolution of rejection behaviors and further threaten populations of some of the greater than 100 species of regular cowbird hosts, favoring host acceptance of parasitic eggs in a mafia-like contest between cowbirds and other species.

References

 Jaramillo and Burke, New World Blackbirds

External links

 Audubon Society: Cowbirds and Conservation

Brood parasites